Sun Xiang (born 15 January 1982) is a Chinese former professional footballer who played as a left back. He played for Shanghai Shenhua, Guangzhou Evergrande, Shanghai SIPG in his native country and spent time on loan at Dutch club PSV Eindhoven and Austrian club Austria Wien. At international level, he made 69 appearances for the China national team scoring 5 goals.

Club career

Shanghai Shenhua
Sun Xiang started his football career playing for Shanghai 02 before the club was taken over by Shanghai Shenhua. He was then promoted to the club's first team in the 2002 season along with his twin brother Sun Ji where they both quickly established themselves within the team. In the 2003 season, he became the club's first-choice left back and won the top tier title with the club. In 2013 the Chinese Football Association revoked the league title after it was discovered the Shenhua General manager Lou Shifang had bribed officials to be bias to Shenhua in games that season.

PSV Eindhoven
Sun, along with Sun Ji, attracted the interests of multiple clubs abroad and had trials with Eredivisie side PSV Eindhoven in 2006, but PSV decided to not sign the pair. The club then decided to sign Sun on loan for the 2006–07 season with an option to sign him on a three-year contract at the end of the season. He made his debut for the club on 17 February 2007 in a 2–0 win against Heracles Almelo, becoming the first ever Chinese footballer to play in the Eredivisie. He made his European continental debut on 20 February 2007 in a 1–0 win against Arsenal, becoming the first ever Chinese player to play in the UEFA Champions League. Then manager Ronald Koeman remarked that Sun had an impressive debut and contributed to the game through his good vision and precise passing. After the end of his loan period, he was not offered a long-term contract with the club despite appeals from Sun to stay with the club.

Austria Wien
On 1 July 2008, Sun was loaned to Austrian Bundesliga side Austria Wien on a one-year deal with the possibility of a one-year extension, becoming the first ever Chinese footballer to play in the Austrian Bundesliga. He made his debut on 9 July 2008 in a 1–1 draw against SK Austria Kärnten. This was followed by his first league goal for the club on 7 March 2009 in a 4–0 victory against LASK Linz. When his loan period expired, he returned to Shanghai where he played for the remainder of the 2009 season.

Guangzhou Evergrande
On 28 April 2010, Sun announced that he gave up joining A-League side Sydney FC and transferred to second-tier side Guangzhou Evergrande instead. He made his debut for the club alongside Zheng Zhi on 21 July 2010 in a 10–0 win against Nanjing Yoyo. He scored his first goal for the club on 18 September 2010 in a 2–1 win against Yanbian FC. In the 2010 season, he made fourteen appearances as Guangzhou finished first place in the second tier and won promotion back to the top flight at the first attempt. The following season Sun continued to be a major part of the club that invested heavily in improving the squad; and with the club bringing in two-time Campeonato Brasileiro Série A Player of the Year winner Darío Conca, the club won its first ever top tier title in the 2011 season.

Shanghai SIPG
On 5 January 2015, Sun transferred to fellow Chinese Super League side Shanghai SIPG. He made his debut for the club on 7 March 2015 in a 2–1 win against Jiangsu Sainty. On 17 July 2016, Sun accidentally collided with Demba Ba and broke Ba's left leg in a 2–1 loss against Shanghai Shenhua. In December 2016, it was revealed that Sun was diagnosed as highly aggressive B-cell lymphoma. Sun did not clarify or confirm the report. On 6 February 2017, Shanghai SIPG announced Sun had left the club due to "physical problems".

Career statistics

Club

International goals

Scores and results list China's goal tally first, score column indicates score after each Sun goal.

Honours

Club
Shanghai Shenhua
Chinese FA Super Cup: 2002

PSV Eindhoven
Eredivisie: 2006–07

Austria Wien
Austrian Cup: 2008–09

Guangzhou Evergrande
Chinese Super League: 2011, 2012, 2013, 2014
Chinese League One: 2010
Chinese FA Cup: 2012
Chinese Super Cup: 2012
AFC Champions League: 2013

International
China
East Asian Football Championship: 2005, 2010

Individual
Chinese Super League Team of the Year: 2005, 2012
AFC Champions League Dream Team: 2013

References

External links
Sun Xiang profile with detailed statistics and biography timeline
Player profile – doha-2006.com

1982 births
Living people
Chinese twins
Twin sportspeople
Association football fullbacks
Chinese footballers
Footballers from Shanghai
China international footballers
Shanghai Shenhua F.C. players
Chinese expatriate footballers
PSV Eindhoven players
Eredivisie players
Austrian Football Bundesliga players
FK Austria Wien players
Guangzhou F.C. players
Shanghai Port F.C. players
Chinese Super League players
China League One players
2004 AFC Asian Cup players
2007 AFC Asian Cup players
Footballers at the 2002 Asian Games
Footballers at the 2006 Asian Games
Asian Games competitors for China